Gladiolus 'Priscilla' is a cultivar of Gladiolus (Gladiolus x gandavensis) which has tri-colored flowers. They have a white ruffled flowers with pink edges, and a soft yellow throat. The florets (6 - 7 per stem) are arranged on strong and erect spikes adorned by pointed sword-like leaves.

Cultivation
The hardy to between USDA Zones 7 -10.

In general Gladioli prefer to grow in full sun and have plenty of water during the growing season, but will still grow successfully in partial shade. They can be grown in pots or garden borders. The corms should be planted in spring and the young growth should be staked (to stop toppling over). In autumn, the corms should be lifted out of the soil, and then stored in a cool, dry and dark place until next spring.

See also 
 List of Gladiolus varieties

References

Priscilla
Ornamental plant cultivars